This is a list of members of Parliament in Wales, elected for the Fiftieth Parliament of the United Kingdom in the 1987 general election.

List 

 Donald Anderson
 Nicholas Bennett
 Alex Carlile
 Ann Clwyd
 Donald Coleman
 Denzil Davies
 Ron Davies
 Huw Edwards
 Paul Flynn
 Michael Foot
 Win Griffiths
 Ian Grist
 Raymond Gower
 Geraint Howells
 Kim Howells
 Royston John Hughes
 Brynmor John
 Barry Jones
 Gwilym Jones
 Martyn David Jones
 Ieuan Wyn Jones
 Neil Kinnock
 Richard Livsey
 John Marek
 Anthony Meyer
 Alun Michael
 John Morris
 Rhodri Morgan
 Paul Murphy
 Ray Powell
 Keith Raffan
 Wyn Roberts
 Allan Rogers
 Ted Rowlands
 John Smith
 Dafydd Elis-Thomas
 John Stradling Thomas
 Gareth Wardell
 Dafydd Wigley
 Alan Williams
 Alan Wynne Williams

See also 

 Lists of MPs for constituencies in Wales

Lists of MPs for constituencies in Wales
Lists of UK MPs 1987–1992